Nampara Majarkuri is a village in Kamrup, situated in north bank of river Brahmaputra .

Transport
Nampara Majarkuri is accessible through National Highway 31. All major private commercial vehicles ply between Nampara Majarkuri and nearby towns.

See also
 Nahira
 Pachim Samaria

References

Villages in Kamrup district